Miroslav Raduljica (born January 5, 1988) is a Serbian professional basketball player for Crvena zvezda of the Adriatic League and the EuroLeague. He also represents the Serbian national basketball team in international competition.

Professional career
Raduljica began his career playing with the KK FMP junior teams in Serbia. He made his professional debut with FMP during the 2005–06 season. He spent the 2006–07 season on loan at KK Borac Čačak and then moved back to FMP.

On July 8, 2010, Raduljica signed a five-year contract with Turkish club Efes Pilsen, but was loaned to Alba Berlin during the season, with which he reached the finals of the German Bundesliga. On August 25, 2011, Raduljica was loaned to Partizan Belgrade for one season. On September 22, 2012, Raduljica was loaned to the Ukrainian team Azovmash for one season.

On July 26, 2013, Raduljica signed with the Milwaukee Bucks of the National Basketball Association. In his rookie season, Raduljica played sparingly for the 15-67 Bucks, averaging just 9.7 minutes per game. In 48 games, he averaged 3.8 points and 2.3 rebounds per game.

On August 26, 2014, Raduljica was traded, along with Carlos Delfino and a 2015 second round draft pick, to the Los Angeles Clippers in exchange for Jared Dudley and a 2017 conditional first round draft pick. On August 29, 2014, he was waived by the Clippers.

On September 19, 2014, Raduljica signed a one-year, $1.5 million guaranteed contract with the Shandong Lions of the Chinese Basketball Association. On December 23, 2014, his contract was bought out by Shandong for $1.2 million. In 14 games, he averaged 18 points and 9 rebounds per game.

On January 8, 2015, Raduljica signed a 10-day contract with the Minnesota Timberwolves. On January 19, 2015, he signed a second 10-day contract with the Timberwolves. On January 28, 2015, he was waived by the Timberwolves after appearing in five games.

On July 18, 2015, Raduljica signed a two-year deal with Greek club Panathinaikos. On December 4, 2015, he had a personal career single-game scoring high in EuroLeague, with 25 points against Barcelona in a 93-86 home win. After one season, he parted ways with the team.

On July 15, 2016, Raduljica signed a two-year deal with Italian team EA7 Emporio Armani Milano. After one season, he left Milano. On June 9, 2017, he signed with the Jiangsu Dragons of the Chinese Basketball Association. Raduljica averaged 25.4 points and 9.8 rebounds per game in the 2019-20 season. On September 3, 2020, he signed with Zhejiang Lions.

In July 2021, Raduljica signed for the Goyang Orions of the Korean Basketball League. He was waived on December 11, after averaging 8.6 points and 5.3 rebounds per game.

Serbian national team

Raduljica played with the Serbian junior national teams and with them he won gold medals at the 2005 FIBA Europe Under-18 Championship, the 2007 FIBA Under-19 World Championship, and the 2008 FIBA Europe Under-20 Championship (where he was named the MVP).

He also played with the senior team that won the silver medal at the EuroBasket 2009. Raduljica was a member of the Serbian national basketball team that won the silver medal at the 2014 FIBA Basketball World Cup under head coach Aleksandar Đorđević. Over 9 tournament games, he averaged 13 points and 4.6 rebounds in 21 minutes per game.

He represented Serbia again at the EuroBasket 2015. In the first phase of the tournament, Serbia dominated in the tournament's toughest group, Group B, with a 5-0 record, and then eliminated Finland and Czech Republic in the round of 16 and quarterfinal games, respectively. However, they were stopped in the semifinal game by Lithuania, by a score of 67–64, and eventually lost to the host team, France, in the bronze-medal game, by a score of 81–68. Being a starting center, and one of the team's along with Miloš Teodosić and Nemanja Bjelica, Raduljica averaged 13.5 points and 5.0 rebounds, on 61.7% shooting from the field, in 9 tournament games; playing 18 minutes on average.

Raduljica also represented Serbia at the 2016 Summer Olympics where they won the silver medal, after losing to the United States in the final game with 96–66.

At the 2019 FIBA Basketball World Cup, the national team of Serbia was dubbed as favorite to win the trophy, but was eventually upset in the quarterfinals by Argentina. With wins over the United States and Czech Republic, it finished in fifth place. Raduljica was named the team's captain due to absence of Teodosić and in 7 tournaments games he averaged 6.1 points, 2.1 rebounds and 1.6 assists.

Career statistics

CBA

|-
| style="text-align:left;"| 2014–15
| style="text-align:left;"| Shandong
| 14 || 2 || 26.1 || .538 || .000 || .795 || 9.1 || 1.7 || 1.3 || .3 || 18.3
|-
| style="text-align:left;"| 2017–18
| style="text-align:left;" rowspan=3|Jiangsu
| style="background:#cfecec;" | 38* || 12 || 30.9 || .541 || .217 || .835 || 9.8 || 2.8 || 1.4 || .4 || 21.8
|-
| style="text-align:left;"| 2018–19
| 44 || 23 || 30.2 || .579 || .442 || .830 || 9.6 || 2.9 || 1.2 || .8 || 22.9
|-
| style="text-align:left;"| 2019–20
| 30 || 16 || 31.5 || .556 || .377 || .803 || 9.8 || 2.6 || 1.2 || .9 || 25.4
|-
| style="text-align:left;"| 2020–21
| style="text-align:left;"| Zhejiang
| 35 || 34 || 31.9 || .534 || .283 || .803 || 10.5 || 4.5 || 1.2 || .5 || 23.6
|-class="sortbottom"
| style="text-align:center;" colspan="2"| Career
| 161 || 87 || 30.1 || .550 || .264 || .813 || 9.8 || 2.9 || 1.3 || .6 || 22.4

EuroLeague

|-
| style="text-align:left;"| 2010–11
| style="text-align:left;"| Efes Pilsen
| 4 || 0 || 3.9 || 1.000 || .000 || 1.000 || .0 || .5 || .3 || .0 || 1.3 || .8
|-
| style="text-align:left;"| 2011–12
| style="text-align:left;"| Partizan
| 10 || 3 || 13.0 || .385 || .000 || .794 || 3.3 || .5 || .1 || .4 || 5.7 || 5.1
|-
| style="text-align:left;"| 2015–16
| style="text-align:left;"| Panathinaikos
| 27 || 9 || 20.3 || .568 || .000 || .821 || 4.4 || 1.3 || .7 || .1 || 12.7 || 13.7
|-
| style="text-align:left;"| 2016–17
| style="text-align:left;"| Milano
| 29 || 23 || 15.3 || .520 || .000 || .806 || 3.2 || .9 || .6 || .1 || 8.1 || 7.8
|-class="sortbottom"
| style="text-align:center;" colspan="2"| Career
| 70 || 35 || 17.09 || .544 || .000 || .816 || 3.7 || 1.0 || .5 || .2 || 9.9 || 10.3

NBA

Regular season

|-
| style="text-align:left;"| 
| style="text-align:left;"| Milwaukee
| 48 || 2 || 9.7 || .540 || .000 || .818 || 2.3 || .5 || .1 || .3 || 3.8
|-
| style="text-align:left;"| 
| style="text-align:left;"| Minnesota
| 5 || 0 || 4.6 || .375 || .000 || 1.000 || 1.0 || .0 || .1 || .0 || 1.6
|-class="sortbottom"
| style="text-align:center;" colspan="2"| Career
| 53 || 2 || 9.2 || .530 || .000 || .825 || 2.1 || .4 || .2 || .2 || 3.6

See also 
 List of European basketball players in the United States
 List of Serbian NBA players
 List of Olympic medalists in basketball

References

External links

Miroslav Raduljica at fiba.com
Miroslav Raduljica at draftexpress.com
Miroslav Raduljica at eurobasket.com
Miroslav Raduljica at euroleague.net

1988 births
Living people
2014 FIBA Basketball World Cup players
2019 FIBA Basketball World Cup players
ABA League players
Alba Berlin players
Anadolu Efes S.K. players
Basketball League of Serbia players
Basketball players at the 2016 Summer Olympics
BC Azovmash players
Centers (basketball)
Jiangsu Dragons players
KK Borac Čačak players
KK Crvena zvezda players
KK FMP (1991–2011) players
KK Partizan players
Lega Basket Serie A players
Medalists at the 2009 Summer Universiade
Medalists at the 2016 Summer Olympics
Milwaukee Bucks players
Minnesota Timberwolves players
National Basketball Association players from Serbia
Olympic basketball players of Serbia
Olympic medalists in basketball
Olympic silver medalists for Serbia
Panathinaikos B.C. players
People from Inđija
Serbia men's national basketball team players
Serbian expatriate basketball people in China
Serbian expatriate basketball people in Germany
Serbian expatriate basketball people in Greece
Serbian expatriate basketball people in Italy
Serbian expatriate basketball people in South Korea
Serbian expatriate basketball people in Turkey
Serbian expatriate basketball people in Ukraine
Serbian expatriate basketball people in the United States
Serbian men's basketball players
Shandong Hi-Speed Kirin players
Undrafted National Basketball Association players
Universiade gold medalists for Serbia
Universiade medalists in basketball